Marianne Comtell is an actress known for the 1969 film Police Chief Pepe, The Sensuous Sicilian (1973), and Garcon! (1983). She also appeared in Safety Catch, a film directed by French director Yves Boisset.

Movies and Television

References

External links

https://www.fdb.cz/lidi-filmografie-zanrova/214123-marianne-comtell.html
http://www.ivid.it/foto/cinema/Drammatico/1969/caso-Venere-privata/239678/Raffaella-Carra/Raffaella-Carra-Bruno-Cremer-Renaud-Verley-Marianne
http://en.unifrance.org/directories/person/126431/marianne-comtell
https://flickseeker.com/SearchResults/SearchBySearchTerms?searchTerms=Marianne%20Comtell
https://kifim.fr/people/marianne-comtell/58876/

Year of birth missing (living people)
Living people
French television actresses
French film actresses